Waldner is surname of:

 Benita Ferrero-Waldner (born 1948), an Austrian diplomat and politician
 Erwin Waldner (1933–2015), German footballer
  (born 1969), Austrian journalist
 Georg Friedrich Sylvius Waldner, known as "" (1583–1629)
 Henriette Louise Waldner de Freundstein (Freunstein), Baronne d'Oberkirch (1754, Schweighouse, Alsace - 1803)
 Jan-Ove Waldner (born 1965, Stockholm), a Swedish table tennis player
 Jean-Baptiste Waldner (born  1959), a French engineer, management consultant and author
  (13/14th century), Bishop of Brixen
 Liz Waldner (born ?, Cleveland, Ohio), an American poet
 Peter Waldner, the creator of the syndicated comic strip Flight Deck
 Teodoro Waldner (born 1927), Argentine Air Force commander
 Walter Waldner (born 1929), an Austrian sprint canoer

German-language surnames